This was the first edition of the tournament.

Walter Trusendi and Matteo Viola won the title after defeating Marcelo Arévalo and José Hernández-Fernández 5–7, 6–2, [12–10] in the final.

Seeds

Draw

References
 Main Draw
 Qualifying Draw

Tempe Challenger - Doubles